El Rojo is the second full-length studio album by The Bakerton Group, otherwise known as "the psychedelic instrumental jazz-laden alter ego" of Clutch. Released in 2009, the album marks the debut of keyboardist Per Wiberg (then of Opeth), who replaced Mick Schauer.

Background
The title of the album began as the working title for a song that was never included on the album. "El Rojo" was used because it reminded the band of the progressive rock band King Crimson. 
Dan Maines further elaborated upon the King Crimson allusion, noting that Fallon intended El Rojo (Spanish for "the red one") as a reference to Red.

However, Neil Fallon has given another explanation for the title which indicated that "El Rojo" was:

As Fallon explains, "Bill Proger's Galaxy" makes reference to a pseudonym adopted by a friend:

The Bakerton Group first met Per Wiberg while the latter was touring with Spiritual Beggars, and then again when Wiberg toured with Opeth.  During the Opeth tour, The Bakerton Group invited Wiberg to jam on-stage with them and, based on that chemistry, asked Wiberg to join the band for the El Rojo recording sessions.  Opeth's tour scheduling provided an opportunity for Wiberg to collaborate with the band in-the-studio.

Track listing

Personnel 
 Neil Fallon - Guitar
 Tim Sult – Guitar
 Dan Maines – Bass guitar
 Jean-Paul Gaster – Drums
 Per Wiberg – Keyboards
 J. Robbins – Producer

References

External links
The Bakerton Group on Myspace

2009 albums
The Bakerton Group albums
Albums produced by J. Robbins